White devil or white demon may refer to:
 The White Devil, a 1612 tragedy by John Webster
 The White Devil (film), a 1930 German film directed by Alexandre Volkoff 
 White Devils, a 2004 novel by Paul J. McAuley
 Black God, White Devil, a 1964 Brazilian film
 Div-e Sepid (literally, "white demon"), the chieftain of divs (demons) from the epic Shahnameh
 a nickname for Amuro Ray, a fictional character in Mobile Suit Gundam
 a nickname for Takamachi Nanoha, a fictional character in Mahou Shoujo Lyrical Nanoha
 "White Demon", ring name of wrestler Ricky Marvin
White Devil, a song by Alexisonfire on the album Watch Out! (2004)